This year is notable for the Sinking of the Titanic in April 15, 1912.

Events

January

 January 1 – The Republic of China is established.
 January 5 – The Prague Conference (6th All-Russian Conference of the Russian Social Democratic Labour Party) opens.
 January 6 
 German geophysicist Alfred Wegener first presents his theory of continental drift.
 New Mexico become the 47th U.S. State.
 January 8 – The African National Congress is founded as the South African Native National Congress, at the Waaihoek Wesleyan Church in Bloemfontein, to promote improved rights for black South Africans, with John Langalibalele Dube as its first president.
 January 14 – Raymond Poincaré forms a coalition government in France, beginning his first term of office as Prime Minister on 21 January.
 January 17 – British polar explorer Captain Robert Falcon Scott and a team of four become the second expeditionary group to reach the South Pole.
 January 18 (Old Style January 5) – Prague Conference: Vladimir Lenin and the Bolshevik Party break away from the rest of the Russian Social Democratic Labour Party.
 January 23 – The International Opium Convention is signed at The Hague to restrict exports.

February 

 February 12 – The Manchu Qing dynasty of China comes to an end after 268 years with the abdication of Emperor Puyi in favour of the Republic of China.
 February 24 – Battle of Beirut: Italy makes a surprise attack on the Ottoman port of Beirut, when the cruiser Giuseppe Garibaldi and the gunboat Volturno bombard the harbour, killing 97 sailors and civilians.
 February 29 – Serbia and Bulgaria secretly sign a treaty of alliance for a term of eight years, with each pledging to come to the defense of the other during war.

March 

 March 1 – Albert Berry is reported to have made the first parachute jump from a flying airplane.
 March 6 – Italian forces become the first to use airships in war as two dirigibles drop bombs on Turkish troops encamped at Janzur, from an altitude of 6,000 feet.
 March 7 – Roald Amundsen, in Hobart, Tasmania, announces his success in reaching the South Pole the previous December.

 March 12 – The Girl Scouts is founded by Juliette Gordon Low, in Savannah, Georgia.
 March 16 – Lawrence Oates, dying member of Scott's South Pole expedition, leaves the tent saying, "I am just going outside and may be some time."
 March 22 – The State of Bihar is formed out of the erstwhile State of Bengal, in British India.
 March 27 – Mayor Yukio Ozaki of Tokyo gives 3,000 cherry trees to be planted in Washington, D.C., to symbolize the friendship between Japan and the United States.
 March 29 – The remaining members of Robert Falcon Scott's South Pole expedition die.
 March 30 – The French Third Republic establishes the French protectorate in Morocco by the Treaty of Fes with Sultan Abd al-Hafid of Morocco.

April 

 April 1 – A partial lunar eclipse takes place, the first of two lunar eclipses this year. It is the 61st lunar eclipse of the 111th Saros cycle, which started with a penumbral lunar eclipse on June 10, 830 AD and will conclude with another penumbral lunar eclipse on July 19, 2092.
 April 10 – White Star liner  departs from Southampton, England, with more than 2,200 passengers and crew on her maiden voyage, bound for New York.
 April 11 –  makes her last call, at Queenstown in Ireland.
 April 14–15 – Sinking of the RMS Titanic:  strikes an iceberg in the northern Atlantic Ocean and sinks with the loss of more than 1,500 lives. The wreck will not be discovered until 1985.
 April 14 – Santos FC, a Brazilian association football club, is founded in State of Sao Paulo.
 April 16 – Harriet Quimby becomes the first woman to fly across the English Channel.
 April 17
 Lena massacre: Russian troops kill or wound 500 striking gold miners in Siberia.
 A hybrid solar eclipse is the 30th solar eclipse of Solar Saros 137.
 April 18 – Cunard Line vessel  arrives in New York with the 705  survivors.
 April 20
 Fenway Park in Boston, Massachusetts opens.
 Yogindranath Tagore founds Baranagore Ramakrishna Mission Ashrama High School in West Bengal, India.
 April 24 – English association football club Barnsley win the FA Cup.
 April 30 – Carl Laemmle founds Universal Studios as the Universal Film and Manufacturing Company in the United States.

May 

 May 1 – `Abdu'l-Bahá lays the cornerstone for the Bahá'í House of Worship in Wilmette, Illinois.
 May 5 – The Olympic Games open in Stockholm, Sweden.
 May 11 – Alaska becomes a territory of the United States.
 May 13 – In the United Kingdom, the Royal Flying Corps (forerunner of the Royal Air Force) is established.
 May 23 – The Hamburg America Line's  is launched in Hamburg and is the world's largest ship.
 May 30 – Pioneer aviator Wilbur Wright (of the Wright brothers) dies of typhoid fever in Dayton, Ohio.

June 

 June 6 – The Novarupta volcano ( southwest of Anchorage) experiences a VEI 6 eruption (the largest in the 20th century).
 June 30 – Canada's deadliest tornado strikes Regina, Saskatchewan killing 28 people.

July 

 July 1 – Harriet Quimby, who set the record as the first woman to fly the English Channel two months previously, dies in Squantum, Massachusetts, after her brand-new two-seat Bleriot monoplane crashes, killing both Quimby and her passenger.
 July 12 – The United States release of Sarah Bernhardt's film Les Amours de la reine Élisabeth is influential in the development of the movie feature. Adolph Zukor, who incorporates Paramount Pictures on May 8, 1914, launches his company as the distributor. Paramount celebrates its centennial in 2012.
 July 30 – Emperor Meiji of Japan dies; he is succeeded by his son Yoshihito, who becomes Emperor Taishō. In the history of Japan, the event marks the end of the Meiji period and the beginning of the Taishō period.

August 

 August 4 – United States occupation of Nicaragua: U.S. Marines land from the USS Annapolis in Nicaragua, to support the conservative government at its request.
 August 12 – Sultan Abd al-Hafid of Morocco abdicates.
 August 21 – The first Eagle Scout (Boy Scouts of America) earns his rank.
 August 29 – A typhoon strikes China, killing at least 50,000 people.

September 

 September 4 – The government of the Ottoman Empire agrees to the demands put forward in the Albanian Revolt of 1912.
 September 28 – W. C. Handy publishes "The Memphis Blues" in the United States.

October 

 October 8 – The First Balkan War begins: Montenegro declares war against the Ottoman Empire.
 October 10 – The Maternity Allowance Act goes into effect in Australia, but excludes minorities.
 October 14 – John Flammang Schrank attempts to assassinate Theodore Roosevelt in Milwaukee.
 October 16 – Bulgarian pilots Radul Minkov and Prodan Toprakchiev perform the second bombing with an airplane in history, at the railway station of Karaagac near Edirne, against Turkey.
 October 17 – Krupp engineers Benno Strauss and Eduard Maurer patent austenitic stainless steel.
 October 18 – Italy and the Ottoman Empire sign a treaty in Ouchy near Lausanne, ending the Italo-Turkish War.
 October 18–October 21 – First Balkan War: The Greek navy captures the island of Lemnos for use as a forward base against the Dardanelles.
 October 24 – First Balkan War: Battle of Kumanovo – Serbian forces defeat the Ottoman army in Vardar Macedonia.
 October
 Edgar Rice Burroughs' character Tarzan first appears in Tarzan of the Apes, in American pulp magazine The All-Story.
 Sax Rohmer's character Fu Manchu first appears in the first story of The Mystery of Dr. Fu-Manchu in English pulp magazine The Story-Teller.

November 

 November 5 – 1912 United States presidential election: New Jersey Governor Woodrow Wilson wins over former president Theodore Roosevelt and incumbent president William Howard Taft.
 November 11 – William Lawrence Bragg presents his derivation of Bragg's law for the angles for coherent and incoherent scattering from a crystal lattice, creating the field of x-ray crystallography, and making possible the eventual imaging of the double helix of DNA.
 November 25 – Românul de la Pind, the longest-running newspaper by and about Aromanians until World War II, ceases its publications.
 November 28 – Albania declares independence from the Ottoman Empire.

December 

December 3 – Bulgaria, Greece, Montenegro, and Serbia (the Balkan League) sign an armistice with the Ottoman Empire, temporarily halting the First Balkan War. (The armistice will expire on February 3, 1913, and hostilities will resume.)
 December 18 – Piltdown Man, thought to be the fossilized skull of a hitherto unknown form of early human, is presented to the Geological Society of London (it is revealed to be a hoax in 1953).
 December 24 – Merck files patent applications in Germany for synthesis of the entactogenic drug MDMA (Ecstasy), developed by Anton Köllisch.
 December 30 – The First Balkan War ends temporarily: Bulgaria, Greece, Montenegro, and Serbia (the Balkan League countries) sign an armistice with Turkey, ending the two-month-long war.

Date unknown 

 Casimir Funk identifies vitamins.
 Sylhet is reconstituted into the non-regulation Chief Commissioner's Province of Assam (Northeast Frontier Province).
 The Scoville Unit (used to measure the heat of peppers) is devised and tested by Wilbur Scoville.
 Wilfrid Voynich discovers the eponymous manuscript in the Villa Mondragone.
 The Government College of Technology, Rasul is established in the Punjab.
 Ludwig von Mises publishes his foundational The Theory of Money and Credit in the original German.
 Articulated trams are invented and first used by the Boston Elevated Railway.

Births

January 

 January 1
 Kim Philby, British spy (d. 1989)
 Salah al-Din al-Bitar, Syrian politician, 2-time Prime Minister of Syria (d. 1980)
 January 3 – Armand Lohikoski, Finnish director (d. 2005)
 January 5 – Gilbert Ralston, British-American screenwriter, television producer (d. 1999)
 January 6
 Jacques Ellul, French philosopher (d. 1994)
 Danny Thomas, American actor, comedian (d. 1991)
 January 7
 Charles Addams, American cartoonist (d. 1988)
 Ivan Yakubovsky, Marshal of the Soviet Union (d. 1976)
 January 8
 José Ferrer, Puerto Rican actor (d. 1992)
 Lawrence E. Walsh, American jurist (d. 2014)
 January 9 – Basil Langton, English actor, authority on the stage works of George Bernard Shaw (d. 2003)
 January 10
 Jessie Lichauco, Cuban-born Filipino-American philanthropist (d. 2021)
 Maria Mandl, Austrian concentration camp guard and war criminal (d. 1948)
 Reinholds Robots, Latvian footballer (d. - )
 January 11 – Abdul Haq, Pakistani Islamic scholar (d. 1988)
 January 12 – Paul Birch, American actor (d. 1969)
 January 15 – Michel Debré, 99th Prime Minister of France (d. 1996)
 January 19 – Leonid Kantorovich, Russian economist, Nobel Prize laureate (d. 1986)
 January 21 – Konrad Emil Bloch, German-born biochemist, recipient of the Nobel Prize in Physiology or Medicine (d. 2000)
 January 23 – Susan French, American actress (d. 2003)
 January 27
Marc Daniels, American television director (d. 1989)
 Arne Næss, Norwegian philosopher (d. 2009)
 Francis Rogallo, American aeronautical engineer (d. 2009)
 January 28 – Jackson Pollock, American painter (d. 1956)
 January 30
 Werner Hartmann, German physicist (d. 1988)
 Barbara Tuchman, American historian (d. 1989)
 Francis Schaeffer, American Evangelical theologian, philosopher, and Presbyterian pastor (d. 1984)
 January 31 
 Camilo Ponce Enríquez, 30th President of Ecuador (d. 1976)
 Infanta Maria Adelaide of Portugal, Portuguese royal (d. 2012)

February 

 February 2
 Millvina Dean, youngest passenger and last survivor of the Sinking of the RMS Titanic (d. 2009)
 February 3 – Lynn Patrick, Canadian ice hockey player, executive (d. 1980)
 February 4
 Erich Leinsdorf, Austrian conductor (d. 1993)
 Byron Nelson, American golfer (d. 2006)
 February 6 – Eva Braun, Adolf Hitler's wife (d. 1945)
 February 7 – Roberta McCain, American socialite and oil heiress; mother of U.S. Senator John McCain (d. 2020)
 February 11 – Roy Fuller, English poet, novelist (d. 1991)
 February 14 – Juan Pujol García, Spanish Catalan double agent (d. 1988)
 February 19 – Ursula Torday, British writer (d. 1997)
 February 20 – Pierre Boulle, French author (d. 1994)
 Julius Johan Jacques Volkerts , Surinamese politician (d. 1963)
 February 27 – Lawrence Durrell, British writer (d. 1990)
 February 28 – Bertil, Swedish prince, Duke of Halland (d. 1997)
 February 29 – Kamil Tolon, Turkish businessperson (d. 1978)

March 

 March 1 – Boris Chertok, Polish-born Russian rocket designer (d. 2011)
 March 3 – Wally Cassell, Italian-born American actor (d. 2015)
 March 4
 Afro Basaldella, Italian painter (d. 1976)
 Judith Furse, British character actress (d. 1974)
 Carl Marzani, American documentarian (d. 1994)
 March 5
 David Astor, British newspaper publisher (d. 2001)
 Jack Marshall, 28th Prime Minister of New Zealand (d. 1988)
 March 8 – Joachim Schepke, German submarine commander (d. 1941)
 March 9 – Francis Hovell-Thurlow-Cumming-Bruce, 8th Baron Thurlow, British peer and diplomat (d. 2013)
 March 12 – Irving Layton, Canadian poet (d. 2006)
 March 13 – Charles Schepens, Belgian-American ophthalmologist (d. 2006)
 March 14
 Les Brown, American band leader (d. 2001)
 W. Graham Claytor Jr., American railroad executive (d. 1994)
 W. Willard Wirtz, American administrator (d. 2010)
 March 15 – Lightnin' Hopkins, American musician (d. 1982)
 March 16 – Pat Nixon, First Lady of the United States (d. 1993)
 March 17 – Bayard Rustin, African-American civil rights activist (d. 1987)
 March 18
 Lucien Laurin, Canadian horse trainer (d. 2000)
 Art Gilmore, American radio, television announcer (d. 2010)
 March 19 
 Adolf Galland, German general, World War II fighter ace (d. 1996)
 William Frankland, British immunologist (d. 2020)
 March 20 – Ralph Hauenstein, American philanthropist and businessman (d. 2016)
 March 22
 Karl Malden, American actor (d. 2009)
 Alfred Schwarzmann, German artistic gymnast (d. 2000)
 March 23 – Wernher von Braun, German-born American physicist, engineer (d. 1977)
 March 24 – Dorothy Height, American civil rights activist (d. 2010)
 March 25 – Jean Vilar, French stage actor (d. 1971)
 March 27 – James Callaghan, Prime Minister of the United Kingdom (d. 2005)
 March 29 – Hanna Reitsch, German aviator (d. 1979)
 March 31 – William Lederer, American writer (d. 2009)

April 

 April 2 – Herbert Mills, American singer, "Mills Brothers" tenor (d. 1989)
 April 4 – Joie Chitwood, American racecar driver and businessman (d. 1988)
 April 5 – John Le Mesurier, British actor (d. 1983)
 April 7 – Jack Lawrence, American composer (d. 2009)
 April 8
 Alois Brunner, Austrian captain (d. 2001)
 Sonja Henie, Norwegian figure skater (d. 1969)
 April 10
 Roy Hofheinz, American businessman, politician and creator of the Houston Astrodome (d. 1982)
 Boris Kidrič, 1st Prime Minister of Slovenia (d. 1953)
 April 11 – Gusti Wolf, Austrian actress (d. 2007)
 April 12 
 Hamengkubuwono IX, 9th Sultan of Yogyakarta and 2nd Vice President of Indonesia (d. 1988)
 Oswaldo Louzada, Brazilian actor (d. 2008)
 Walt Gorney, American actor (d. 2004)
 April 13 – William J. Tuttle, American makeup artist (d. 2007)
 April 14
Joie Chitwood, American race at driver (d. 1988)
 Robert Doisneau, French photographer (d. 1994)
 April 15 – Kim Il-sung, President of North Korea (d. 1994)
 April 16
 David Langton, British actor (d. 1994)
 Catherine Scorsese, Italian-American actress (d. 1997)
 April 17 – Marta Eggerth, Hungarian-born American actress, singer (d. 2013)
 April 19 – Glenn T. Seaborg, American chemist, Nobel Prize laureate (d. 1999)
 April 22
 Kathleen Ferrier, British contralto (d. 1953)
 Kaneto Shindō, Japanese film director (d. 2012)
 April 26 – A. E. van Vogt, Canadian-born writer (d. 2000)
 April 27 – Zohra Sehgal, Indian stage, film actress (d. 2014)
 April 28 – Odette Sansom, French World War II heroine (d. 1995)

May 

 May 1
 Winthrop Rockefeller, American politician and philanthropist (d. 1973) 
 Otto Kretschmer, German submarine commander, Bundesmarine admiral (d. 1998)
 May 2 
 Axel Springer, German journalist, founder and owner of Axel Springer AG (d. 1985)
 Marten Toonder, Dutch comic creator (d. 2005)
 May 3
 Virgil Fox, American organist (d. 1980)
 John Bryan Ward-Perkins, British archaeologist (d. 1981)
 May 5 – Judd L. Teller, author, historian, writer, poet (d. 1972)
 May 6 – Bill Quinn, American actor (d. 1994)
 May 8 
 Dagny Carlsson, Swedish blogger (d. 2022)
 Ptolemy Reid, 2nd Prime Minister of Guyana (d. 2003)
 May 9 – Pedro Armendáriz, Mexican actor (d. 1963)
 May 11 – Foster Brooks, American actor, comedian (d. 2001)
 May 12 – Mayavaram V. R. Govindaraja Pillai, Carnatic violinist from Tamil Nadu, Southern India (d. 1979)
 May 16 – Studs Terkel, American writer, broadcaster (d. 2008)
 May 17
 Archibald Cox, American Watergate special prosecutor (d. 2004)
 Ace Parker, American baseball, football player (d. 2013)
 May 18
 Perry Como, American singer (d. 2001)
 Walter Sisulu, South African anti-apartheid activist (d. 2003)
 May 20 – Edgar Bischoff, Romanian-born French Composer (d. 1995)
 May 21
 Monty Stratton, American baseball player (d. 1982)
 Akiva Vroman, Dutch-born Israeli geologist, Israel Prize recipient (d. 1989)
 May 22 – Herbert C. Brown, English-born chemist, Nobel Prize laureate (d. 2004)
 May 23
 Betty Astell, British actress (d. 2005)
 Jean Françaix, French composer (d. 1997)
 John Payne, American actor (d. 1989)
 May 25 – Princess Deokhye of Korea (d. 1989)
 May 26
 János Kádár, Hungarian Communist politician (d. 1989)
 Jay Silverheels, native American actor (The Lone Ranger) (d. 1980)
 May 27
 John Cheever, American novelist, short story writer (d. 1982)
 Cedric Phatudi, Chief Minister of Lebowa bantustan (d. 1987)
 Sam Snead, American golfer (d. 2002)
 May 28
 Herman Johannes, Indonesian professor, scientist and politician (d. 1992)
 Patrick White, Australian writer, Nobel Prize laureate (d. 1990)
 May 29 – Pamela Hansford Johnson, English poet, novelist, playwright, literary and social critic (d. 1981)
 May 30
 Julius Axelrod, American biochemist, recipient of the Nobel Prize in Physiology or Medicine (d. 2004)
 Joseph Stein, American librettist (d. 2010)
 May 31
 Alfred Deller, English countertenor (d. 1979)
 Henry M. "Scoop" Jackson, American politician (d. 1983)

June 

 June 4 – Robert Jacobsen, Danish artist (d. 1993)
 June 5 – Dean Amadon, American ornithologist (d. 2003)
 June 6 – Maria Montez, Dominican actress (d. 1951)
 June 8
 Harry Holtzman, American artist (d. 1987)
 Walter Kennedy, American NBA commissioner (d. 1977)
 June 9 – Philip Simmons, American ornamental ironworker (d. 2009)
 June 11
 Phạm Hùng, Vietnamese prime minister (d. 1988)
 Rashid bin Saeed Al Maktoum, 2nd Prime Minister of the United Arab Emirates (d. 1990)
 June 12 – Russell Hayden, American actor (d. 1981)
 June 15 – Fanny Schoonheyt, Dutch Communist fighter in the Spanish Civil War. (d.1961)
 June 16 – Enoch Powell, British politician (d. 1998)
 June 21 – Kazimierz Leski, Polish engineer, fighter pilot, intelligence and counter-intelligence officer (d. 2000)
 June 22 – Raymonde Allain, French model, actress (d. 2008)
 June 23
 Samson Kisekka, Ugandan politician (d. 1999)
 Alan Turing, British mathematician (d. 1954)
 June 24 – Mary Wesley, English novelist (d. 2002)
 June 25 
 Carvalho Leite, Brazilian football (soccer) player (d. 2004)
 William T. Cahill, American politician (d. 1996)
 June 26 
 Roxy Atkins, Canadian hurdler (d. 2002)
 Jan Falkowski, Polish fighter ace (d. 2001)
 June 27
 E. R. Braithwaite, Guyanese novelist, writer, teacher, and diplomat (d. 2016)
 Wilbur Jackett, Canadian scholar, public servant, jurist, and the first chief justice of the Federal Court of Canada (d. 2005)
 June 28 – Glenn Morris, American Olympic athlete (d. 1974)
 June 29 – Émile Peynaud, French oenologist, researcher (d. 2004)
 June 30 
 María Luisa Dehesa Gómez Farías, Mexican architect (d. 2009)
 Ludwig Bölkow, German aeronautical engineer (d. 2003)

July 
 July 1
 Ulla Barding-Poulsen, Danish fencer (d. 2000)
 David R. Brower, American environmentalist (d. 2000)
 Pinhas Scheinman, Israeli politician (d. 1999)
 Sally Kirkland, American fashion editor (d. 1989)
 July 2 – Edwin L. Mechem, American politician (d. 2002)
 July 3 – John Buchan Ross, British Royal Air Force officer (d. 2009)
 July 4 – Said Akl, Lebanese poet, philosopher, writer, playwright and language reformer (d. 2014)
 July 6 
 Molly Yard, American feminist (d. 2005)
 Heinrich Harrer, Austrian mountaineer, explorer (d. 2006)
 July 7
Robert Cornog, American physicist and engineer (d. 1998)
Gérard Lecointe, French general (d. 2009)
 July 8 – Christel Goltz, German operatic soprano (d. 2008)
 July 9 – Editta Sherman, Italian-American photographer (d. 2013)
 July 11 – Peta Taylor, English cricketer (d. 1989)
 July 12 
 Petar Stambolić, Yugoslav communist politician (d. 2007)
 Felix Zwolanowski, German international footballer (d. 1998)
 July 13 – Suzanne Haïk-Vantoura, French organist, music teacher, composer and music theorist (d. 2000)
 July 14
 Eben Bartlett, American military officer and politician (d. 1983)
 Woody Guthrie, American folk music singer, songwriter, and musician, best known for his song This Land Is Your Land (d. 1967)
 July 15 
 Helen Roberts, English singer, actress (d. 2010)
 Aleksandar Goldštajn, Croatian university professor, law scholar, writer and constitutional court judge (d. 2010)
 July 16 
 Amy Patterson, Argentine composer, singer, poet, and teacher (d. 2019)
 Ben Bril, Dutch boxer (d. 2003)
 July 17
 Irene Manning, American actress and singer (d. 2004)
 Art Linkletter, American radio and television host, best known as the host of House Party (d. 2010)
 July 18 
 Leonid Chulkov, Soviet Navy Leader, Vice Admiral (d. 2016)
 Max Rousié, French rugby footballer (d. 1959)
 July 19 – Peter Leo Gerety, American Catholic prelate (d. 2016)
 July 20 
 Lucette Destouches, French classical dancer (d. 2019)
 Hideo Itokawa, Japanese aircraft designer, rocketry pioneer (d. 1999)
 John Vivian Dacie, British haematologist (d. 2005)
 Jack Durrance, American rock climber, mountaineer (d. 2003)
 July 21 – Mollie Moon, American civil rights activist (d. 1990)
 July 28 – George Cisar, American actor (d. 1979)
 July 31
 Milton Friedman, American economist, Nobel Prize laureate (d. 2006)
 Irv Kupcinet, American newspaper columnist (d. 2003)

August 

 August 1
 Frank K. Edmondson, American astronomer (d. 2008)
 Donald Seawell, American theater producer, newspaper publisher (d. 2015)
 August 2 – Palle Huld, Danish actor (d. 2010)
 August 3 – Fritz Hellwig, German politician (CDU), European Commissioner for Science & Research (d. 2017)
 August 4 – Raoul Wallenberg, Swedish humanitarian (d. 1947)
 August 7 – Võ Chí Công, Vietnamese Communist politician (d. 2011)
 August 9 – Anne Brown, American soprano (d. 2009)
 August 10 – Jorge Amado, Brazilian author (d. 2001)
 August 11 – Norman Levinson, American mathematician (d. 1975)
 August 13
 Ben Hogan, American golfer (d. 1997)
 Salvador Luria, Italian-born biologist, recipient of the Nobel Prize in Physiology or Medicine (d. 1991)
 August 15
 Julia Child, American television chef (d. 2004)
 Ustad Amir Khan, Indian classical vocal singer (d. 1974)
 Naoto Tajima, Japanese athlete (d. 1990)
 August 16
 Ted Drake, English footballer (d. 1995)
 Wendy Hiller, English actress (d. 2003)
 August 18 – Otto Ernst Remer, German Wehrmacht officer (d. 1997)
 August 23 
 Nelson Rodrigues, Brazilian playwright, journalist and novelist (d. 1980)
 Gene Kelly, American actor, dancer and film director (d. 1996)
 August 25 – Erich Honecker, East German politician (d. 1994)
 August 27
 Gloria Guinness, Mexican-born English fashion icon (d. 1980)
 José Laurel Jr., Filipino politician (d. 1998)
 August 29 – Son Kitei, Japanese athlete (d. 2002)
 August 30
 Edward Mills Purcell, American physicist, Nobel Prize laureate (d. 1997)
 Nancy Wake, New Zealand World War II heroine (d. 2011)
 August 31 – Katsumi Tezuka, Japanese actor (d. unknown)

September 

 September 1 – Gwynfor Evans, Welsh politician (d. 2005)
 September 5
 John Cage, American composer (d. 1992)
 Kristina Söderbaum, German actress (d. 2001)
 Frank Thomas (animator), American animator and pianist (d. 2004)
 September 7 – David Packard, American electrical engineer (d. 1996)
 September 10 – Mary Walter, Filipino actress (d. 1993)
 September 14 – Eduard von Falz-Fein, Russian-born art patron (d. 2018)
 September 15
 Antonio Blanco, Spanish American Painter (d. 1999)
 Ismail Yassine, Egyptian comedian, actor (d. 1972)
 September 19 
 Kurt Sanderling, German conductor (d. 2011)
 Michael Wright, Hong Kong architect (d. 2018)
 September 21
 Chuck Jones, American animator (Warner Brothers) (d. 2002)
 György Sándor, Hungarian pianist (d. 2005)
 September 22
 Herbert Mataré, German physicist, European co-inventor of the transistor (d. 2011)
 Martha Scott, American actress (d. 2003)
 September 24 – Don Porter, American actor (d. 1997)
 September 27 – Tauno Marttinen, Finnish composer (d. 2008)
 September 29 
 Michelangelo Antonioni, Italian film director (d. 2007)
 Lukas Ammann, Swiss actor (d. 2017)

October 

 October 1 – Kathleen Ollerenshaw, English mathematician (d. 2014)
 October 4 – Meredith Bordeaux, American politician (d. 2014)
 October 5 – Karl Hass, German Nazi war criminal (d. 2004)
 October 6 – Perkins Bass, American politician (d. 2011)
 October 7 – Fernando Belaúnde, 42nd and 43rd President of Peru (d. 2002)
 October 11 – Fedora Alemán, Venezuelan soprano singer (d. 2018)
 October 12
 Muhammad Shamsul Huq, Bangladeshi academic and Minister of Foreign Affairs (d. 2006)
 Grigory Kravchenko, Soviet test pilot and air force general (d. 1943)
 October 13 – Cornel Wilde, Hungarian actor, film director (d. 1989)
 October 15 – Nellie Lutcher, American singer (d. 2007)
 October 16 – Clifford Hansen, American politician (d. 2009)
 October 17 – Pope John Paul I, Italian churchman (d. 1978)
 October 18 – Philibert Tsiranana, Prime Minister and President of Madagascar (d. 1978)
 October 21 – Georg Solti, Hungarian conductor (d. 1997)
 October 22 
 Johan Hendrik Weidner, Belgian World War II resistance fighter (d. 1994)
 George N. Leighton, American judge (d. 2018)
 October 24 – Murray Golden, American television director (d. 1991)
 October 25 – Minnie Pearl, American humorist (d. 1996)
 October 26 – Ed Reimers, American actor, television announcer (d. 2009)
 October 27 – Conlon Nancarrow, American composer (d. 1997)
 October 28 – Richard Doll, English physiologist, epidemiologist (d. 2005) 
 October 30 – Preston Lockwood, English actor/writer (d. 1996)
 October 31 – Ollie Johnston, American animator (d. 2008)
 October 31 – Dale Evans, American singer, actress (d. 2001)

November 

 November 3 – Alfredo Stroessner, President of Paraguay (d. 2006)
 November 4 – Vadim Salmanov, Russian composer (d. 1978)
 November 6 
 George Cakobau, 2nd Governor-General of Fiji (d. 1989)
 Toke Townley, English actor (d. 1984)
 November 8 
 June Havoc, Canadian actress (d. 2010)
 Stylianos Pattakos, Greek military officer (d. 2016)
 November 10
 Birdie Tebbetts, American baseball player, manager (d. 1999)
 Jean-Hilaire Aubame, Gabonese politician (d. 1989)
 November 11 – Larry LaPrise, American songwriter (d. 1996)
 November 13 – Claude Pompidou, wife of French President Georges Pompidou (d. 2007)
 November 14
 Barbara Hutton, American socialite (d. 1979)
 T. Y. Lin, Chinese-born civil engineer (d. 2003)
 November 16
 George O. Petrie, American actor (d. 1997)
 W. E. D. Ross, Canadian writer (d. 1995)
 November 18 – Hilda Nickson, née Hilda Pressley, British novelist (d. 1977)
 November 19 – George Emil Palade, Romanian microbiologist, recipient of the Nobel Prize in Physiology or Medicine (d. 2008)
 November 20 – Otto von Habsburg, Emperor of Austria, King of Hungary in exile (d. 2011)
 November 21 – Eleanor Powell, American actress, dancer (d. 1982)
 November 23
 Virginia Prince, American transgender activist (d. 2009)
 George O'Hanlon, American actor, TV writer (d. 1989)
 Paul Rivière, French Resistance fighter, politician (d. 1998) 
 November 24 – Bernard Delfgaauw, Dutch philosopher (d. 1993)
 November 27 – Connie Sawyer, American actress (d. 2018)
 November 29 – Viola Smith, American drummer (d. 2020)
 November 30
 Hugo del Carril, Argentine film actor, film director and tango singer (d. 1989)
 Gordon Parks, African-American photographer, artist (d. 2006)
 Nihat Erim, Turkish politician, jurist and 30th Prime Minister of Turkey (assassinated) (d. 1980)

December 

 December 1
Billy Raimondi, American baseball player (d. 2010)
Minoru Yamasaki, Japanese-American architect of the World Trade Center (d. 1986)
 December 2 – Boun Oum, 2-time Prime Minister of Laos (d. 1980)
 December 4 – Pappy Boyington, American pilot, United States Marine Corps fighter ace (d. 1988)
 December 5
Keisuke Kinoshita, Japanese film director (d. 1998)
Sonny Boy Williamson II, American blues singer, musician and songwriter (d. 1965)
 December 9 – Blanche Blackwell (née Lindo), Costa Rican-born Jamaican socialite (d. 2017)
 December 10 – Philip Hart, American politician (d. 1976)
 December 11 – Carlo Ponti, Italian film producer (d. 2007)
 December 12 
 Henry Armstrong, American boxer (d. 1988)
 René Toribio, Guadeloupean politician (d. 1990)
 December 14 
 Alfred Lennon, British merchant seaman, amateur musician and father of John Lennon (d. 1976)
 Milner Baily Schaefer, American fisheries scientist (d. 1970)
 December 17 – Edward Short, British politician (d. 2012)
 December 21 – Jean Conan Doyle, British military officer in the Women's Auxiliary Air Force (d. 1997)
 December 22 – Lady Bird Johnson, First Lady of the United States (d. 2007)
 December 24
 Natalino Otto, Italian singer (d. 1969)
 John Henderson, American football player (d. 2020)
 December 26 – Arsenio Lacson, Filipino politician, sportswriter (d. 1962)
 December 27 – Conroy Maddox, British painter (d. 2005)

Date unknown
 Walt Partymiller, American cartoonist (d. 1991)

Deaths

January 

 January 3
 Felix Dahn, German writer (b. 1834)
 Robley D. Evans, American admiral (b. 1846)
 January 4 – Clarence Dutton, American geologist (b. 1841)
 January 7 – Sophia Jex-Blake, English physician and feminist (b. 1840)
 January 14 – Samuel Waite Johnson, British railway engineer (b. 1831)
 January 16 – Georg Heym, German writer (b. 1887)
 January 28
 Gustave de Molinari, Belgian economist (b. 1819)
 Eloy Alfaro, 2-Time President of Ecuador (b. 1842)
 January 29
 Herman Bang, Danish writer (b. 1857)
 Alexander Duff, 1st Duke of Fife, Scottish aristocrat and politician (b. 1849)
 January 30 – Luis Cordero Crespo, 14th President of Ecuador (b. 1833)

February 
 February 4 – Franz Reichelt, Austrian-born French tailor and inventor (b. 1879)
 February 9 – Hyacinthe Loyson, French preacher and theologian (b. 1827)
 February 10 – Joseph Lister, English surgeon (b. 1827)
 February 16 – Nicholas of Japan, Eastern Orthodox monk and saint (b. 1836)
 February 17
 Count Alois Lexa von Aehrenthal, foreign minister (Austria-Hungary) (b. 1854)
 Edgar Evans, Welsh naval officer, member of the Scott expedition to the South Pole (b. 1876)
 February 21 – Osborne Reynolds, Irish physicist (b. 1842)
 February 25 – William IV, Grand Duke of Luxembourg (b. 1852)
 February 28
 Henry Hendrickson, United States Navy seaman (b. 1875)
 Bill Storer, English footballer and cricketer (b. 1867)

March 
 March 1
 George Grossmith, English actor and comic writer (b. 1847)
 Ludvig Holstein-Ledreborg, Prime Minister of Denmark (b. 1839)
 March 3 – Oskar Enqvist, Russian admiral (b. 1849)
 March 4 – Augusto Aubry, Italian admiral and politician (b. 1849)
 March 17 
 Anna Filosofova, Russian feminist activist (b. 1837)
 Lawrence Oates, English army officer, member of the Scott expedition to the South Pole (b. 1880; hypothermia)
 March 22 – Ruggero Oddi, Italian physiologist and anatomist (b. 1864)
 March 29 – Remaining members of the Scott expedition to the South Pole:
 Henry Robertson Bowers, Scottish naval officer (b. 1883)
 Robert Falcon Scott, British naval officer and explorer (b. 1868)
 Edward Adrian Wilson, English physician and naturalist (b. 1872)
 March 30 – Karl May, German author (b. 1842)
 March 31 – Robert Love Taylor, American congressman, senator and Governor from Tennessee (b. 1850)

April 

 April 3 – Calbraith Perry Rodgers, American aviation pioneer, in aircraft accident (b. 1879)
 April 6 – Giovanni Pascoli, Italian poet (b. 1855)
 April 10 – Gabriel Monod, French historian (b. 1844)
 April 12
 Clara Barton, American nurse (b. 1821)
 Frederick Dent Grant, American soldier and statesman (b. 1850)
 April 13 – Ishikawa Takuboku, Japanese author (b. 1886)
 April 14 – Henri Brisson, French statesman (b. 1835)
 April 15 – 1,517 victims of the sinking of the RMS Titanic, including:
 Thomas Andrews, Irish shipbuilder (b. 1873)
 John Jacob Astor IV, American businessman (b. 1864)
 Archibald Butt, American presidential aide (b. 1865)
 Thomas Byles, British Catholic priest (b. 1870)
 Jacques Futrelle, American mystery author and journalist (b. 1875)
 Luigi Gatti, Italian-born restaurateur (b. 1875)
 Sidney Leslie Goodwin, English toddler; youngest victim of the Titanic disaster, unidentified until 2007 (b. 1910)
 Benjamin Guggenheim, American businessman (b. 1865)
 Henry B. Harris, American theater producer (b. 1866)
 Wallace Hartley, English ship's bandleader and violinist (b. 1878)
 Charles Melville Hays, American railroad executive (b. 1856)
 Francis Davis Millet, American painter, sculptor and writer (b. 1846)
 Clarence Moore, American businessman and sportsman (b. 1865)
William McMaster Murdoch, First Officer of the Titanic (b. 1873)
 Jack Phillips, English ship's senior wireless officer (b. 1887)
 Edward Smith, English ship's captain (b. 1850)
 William Thomas Stead, English campaigning journalist (b. 1849)
 Isidor Straus, German American department store owner (Macy's) and member of United States House of Representatives (b. 1845)
 Ida Straus, German American wife of Isidor Straus (1 of only 5 Titanic first-class female fatalities) (b. 1849)
 John B. Thayer, American businessman and sportsman (b. 1862)
 Frank M. Warren Sr., American businessman (b. 1848)
 George Dunton Widener, American businessman (b. 1861)
 Harry Elkins Widener, American bibliophile, son of George Dunton Widener (b. 1885)
Henry Tingle Wilde, Chief Officer of the Titanic (b. 1872)
 April 18 – Martha Ripley, American physician and suffragist (b. 1843)
 April 19 – Patricio Escobar, 9th President of Paraguay (b. 1843)
 April 20 – Bram Stoker, Irish writer (Dracula) (b. 1847)

May 
May 4 – Nettie Stevens, American geneticist credited with discovering sex chromosomes (b. 1861)
May 5 – Rafael Pombo, Colombian poet (b. 1833)
 May 14
 Frederick VIII of Denmark (b. 1843)
 August Strindberg, Swedish playwright and painter (b. 1849)
 May 19 – Marcelino Menéndez Pelayo, Spanish historian, philologist and literary critic (b. 1856)
 May 21 – Sir Julius Wernher, German-born British businessman and art collector (b. 1850)
 May 25 – Austin Lane Crothers, American politician (b. 1860)
 May 28 – Paul-Émile Lecoq de Boisbaudran, French chemist (b. 1838)
 May 30 – Wilbur Wright, American aviation pioneer, of typhoid (b. 1867)

June 
 June 1 – Philip Orin Parmelee, American aviator, in aircraft accident (b. 1887)
 June 9 – Ion Luca Caragiale, Romanian writer (b. 1852)
 June 10 – Anton Aškerc, Slovene poet (b. 1856)
 June 11 – Léon Dierx, French poet (Les Amants) (b. 1838)
 June 12 – Frédéric Passy, French economist, recipient of the Nobel Peace Prize (b. 1822)
 June 16 – Thomas Pollock Anshutz, American painter (b. 1851) 
 June 24 – Sir George White, British field marshal (b. 1835)
 June 25
 Sir Lawrence Alma-Tadema, Dutch-born British painter, died in Germany (b. 1836)
 Louis-Joseph Antoine, Belgian miner and sect leader
 Hubert Latham, French aviator (b. 1883)
 June 27 
 George Bonnor, Australian cricketer (b. 1855)
 Frank Furness, American architect (b. 1839)
 June 30 – Eduardo Blanco, Venezuelan writer and politician (b. 1838)

July 

 July 1 – Harriet Quimby, American aviator (b. 1875)
 July 2 – Tom Richardson, English cricketer (b. 1870)
 July 14 – Belle L. Pettigrew, American educator, missionary (b. 1839)
 July 15 – Francisco Lázaro, Portuguese marathon runner (Olympics)
 July 17 – Henri Poincaré, French mathematician (b. 1854)
 July 30
 Emperor Meiji of Japan (b. 1852)
 Juan Gualberto González, 11th President of Paraguay (b. 1851)
 July 31 – Allan Octavian Hume, British civil servant (b. 1829)

August 
 August 7 – François-Alphonse Forel, Swiss hydrologist (b. 1841)
 August 8 – Ross Winn, American anarchist writer and publisher (b. 1871)
 August 13 – Jules Massenet, French composer (b. 1842)
 August 20
 William Booth, English founder of the Salvation Army (b. 1829)
 Walter Goodman, English painter, illustrator and author (b. 1838)

September 
 September 1 – Samuel Coleridge-Taylor, African-British composer (b. 1875)
 September 5 – Arthur MacArthur Jr., U.S. Army general (b. 1845)
 September 6 – Sir Charles John Stanley Gough, British general and Victoria Cross recipient (b. 1832)
 September 7 – Martin Kähler, German theologian (b. 1835)
 September 12 – Pierre-Hector Coullié, Cardinal-Archbishop of Lyon (b. 1829)
 September 13 – Nogi Maresuke, Japanese general (suicide) (b. 1849)
 September 28 – Frederick Richards, British admiral (b. 1833)
 September 30 – Frances Allitsen, English song composer (b. 1848)

October 

 October 6
October 6 – Auguste Beernaert, Belgian statesman, recipient of the Nobel Peace Prize (b. 1829)
October 6 – Susie King Taylor, African-American army nurse. First nurse of the Black Army (b. 1848)
 October 8 – Wilhelm Kuhe, German composer (b. 1823)
 October 24 – Mykola Lysenko, Ukrainian composer (b. 1842)
 October 30 – James S. Sherman, 27th Vice President of the United States (b. 1855)

November 
 November 1 - Homer Lea, American adventurer and writer (b. 1876)
 November 8 – Dugald Drummond, British railway engineer (b. 1840)
 November 9 – Charlotte A. Gray, British educator and temperance missionary (b. 1844)
 November 10 – Louis Cyr, Canadian strongman (b. 1863)
November 11 – William White Miller, Irish Canadian businessman (b. 1846)
 November 12 – José Canalejas, Prime Minister of Spain (b. 1854) (assassinated)
 November 17 – Richard Norman Shaw, British architect (b. 1831)
 November 26 – Patriarch Joachim III of Constantinople (b. 1834)

December 
 December 12 – Luitpold, Prince Regent of Bavaria, (b. 1821)
 December 13 – Vital Aza, Spanish playwright (b. 1851)
December 14 - Belgrave Edward Sutton Ninnis, British explorer and officer (b. 1887)
 December 15 – Sir Thomas Charles Scanlen, South African politician, Prime Minister of Cape Colony (b. 1834)
 December 18 – William McKendree Carleton, American poet (b. 1845)
 December 23 – Otto Schoetensack, German anthropologist (b. 1850)
 December 29 – Philip H. Cooper, American admiral (b. 1844)

Nobel Prizes 

 Physics – Nils Gustaf Dalén
 Chemistry – Victor Grignard, Paul Sabatier
 Medicine – Alexis Carrel
 Literature – Gerhart Johann Robert Hauptmann
 Peace – Elihu Root

References

Further reading
 Britannica year-book, 1913 (1913) covers 1911 and 1912, global coverage
 Gilbert, Martin. A History of the Twentieth Century: Volume 1 1900-1933 (1997); global coverage of politics, diplomacy and warfare; pp 245–68.

 
Leap years in the Gregorian calendar